Maria Cuadra (born Madrid 26 December 1936) is a Spanish film, television and theater actress who has starred in productions including: Platero y yo, Ultimo Encuentro, Vuelve San Valentin, Marinai, donne e guai and I tromboni di Fradiavolo with Ugo Tognazzi and Raimondo Vianello, and La Cancion del Olvido. 

She is the daughter of bullfighter Antonio Cuadra Belmonte. She married and later divorced Italian movie actor and producer Eduardo De Santis. She has three children from this marriage (Natasha De Santis Cuadra, Nicolas and Antonella De Santis Cuadra). Maria Cuadra lives in Madrid and is active in charity work for international organisations including serving as an ambassador for UNICEF and the International Red Cross.

Filmography 

-Estudio 1 - Dorothy (2 Episodes 1977-1982)

-Cualquier Miercoles (1982) TV Episode

-Los Gigantes de la Montana - Ilse  (1977)

-Canciones de nuestra vida (1975)

-Proceso a Jesus (1973)

-La Donna di Picche (1972)

-The Price of Power - Lucreatia Garfield (1969)

1977-1982 Estudio 1 (TV series) 
Dorothy / Ilse
– Cualquier miércoles (1982) … Dorothy
– Los gigantes de la montaña (1977) … Ilse
 
1975 Canciones de nuestra vida 
 
1974 Proceso a Jesús 
 
1972 La donna di picche (TV mini-series) 
Consuelo Manero
 
1969 The Price of Power 
Lucretia Garfield
 
1969 La canción del olvido 
 
1968 Platero y yo 
Aguedilla
 
1968 A Rather Complicated Girl 
 
1967 The Last Meeting 
 
1967 Fury of Johnny Kid 
Lezerind
 
1967 Granada addio! 
Consuelo Linares
 
1965 Novela (TV series) 
– El regreso (1965)
 
1965 Umorismo in nero 
Maria - segment 3 'La cornacchia'

-La cancion del Olvido (1969)

-Platero y Yo Movie (1968)

-Una ragazza piuttosto complicata (A complicated girl) (1968)

-Último encuentro (1967)

-Dove si spara di piu (Fury of Johnny Kid) (1967)

-Granada Addio - Consuelo Linares (1967)

-Novela 1 Episode (1967)

-El regreso (1965)

-Umorismo in Nero (Black Humor) (1965)

-Io Uccido, tu uccidi (I kill, You Kill) (1965)

-Vuelve San Valentin (1962)

-I tromboni di Fra Diavolo (1962)

-Noche de Verano (1962)

-Los tres ecceteras del colonel (1960)

-Marinai, donne e guai (1958)

-Amore a prima vista (1958)

-Le Belle dell'aria (Las Aeroguapas) (1958)

-La estrella del rey (1957)

-Juan Simón's Daughter

-Marisa la civetta (1957)

External links

-Maria Cuadra at the MTV Movie database

Spanish film actresses
Living people
1936 births
Actresses from Madrid
Spanish television actresses
Spanish stage actresses
20th-century Spanish actresses